The 2005 Maine Black Bears football team was an American football team that represented the University of Maine as a member of the Atlantic 10 Conference during the 2005 NCAA Division I FCS football season. In their 13th season under head coach Jack Cosgrove, the Black Bears compiled a 5–6 record (3–5 against conference opponents) and finished fourth in the Atlantic 10's North Division. Jermaine Walker and Ben Lazarski were the team captains.

Schedule

References

Maine
Maine Black Bears football seasons
Maine Black Bears football